Kleinschmidt is an occupational surname of German origin, which means "small smith", that is, a maker of small forged items and metal hand tools. The name may refer to:

Edward Kleinschmidt (1876–1977), American inventor
Edward Kleinschmidt Mayes (born 1951), American poet
Franz Heinrich Kleinschmidt (1812–1864), German missionary
Jutta Kleinschmidt (born 1962), German race driver
Lena Kleinschmidt (1835–1886), American jewel thief
Mark Kleinschmidt (politician) (born 1970), American politician
Mark Kleinschmidt (rower) (born 1974), German rower 
Otto Kleinschmidt (1870–1954), German ornithologist
Paul Kleinschmidt (1883–1949), German painter
Samuel Kleinschmidt (1814 –1886), German missionary
Theodor Kleinschmidt (1834–1881), German trader and explorer
Tom Kleinschmidt (born 1973), American basketball player
Wilhelm Kleinschmidt (1907–1941), German submarine commander

Other uses
Kleinschmidt family, fictional characters in the television series King of the Hill
Kleinschmidt Inc, an American e-commerce company
Morkrum-Kleinschmidt, a former name of the Teletype Corporation
Kleinschmidt keyboard perforator, invented by Edward Kleinschmidt

References

German-language surnames
Surnames of German origin